This is a list of events in British radio during 1983.

Events

January
4 January – BBC Radio 2 revives Music While You Work.
17 January – BBC Local Radio comes to south west England with the launches of BBC Radio Devon and BBC Radio Cornwall.

February
12 February – Sounds of the 60s is broadcast for the first time on BBC Radio 2.

March
No events.

April
18 April – Prior to the launch of a commercial station covering Gwent, the BBC launches BBC Radio Gwent. It broadcasts at peak time, opting out of BBC Radio Wales. The station broadcasts on VHF/FM and therefore becomes the only part of Wales where English-language radio programming for Wales can be heard on VHF/FM.

May
No events.

June
13 June – Gwent Broadcasting becomes the first station in the UK to occupy the newly released 102.2 to 104.5Mhz part of the VHF/FM waveband.

July
2 July – BBC Radio Medway is expanded to cover all of the county of Kent and is renamed accordingly.

August
No events.

September
No events.

October
6 October – Centre Radio stops broadcasting after running into financial difficulties. A take-over bid is rejected by the IBA and the station goes off air at 5.30pm.
22 October – BBC Radio Brighton is expanded to cover all of the county of Sussex and is accordingly renamed BBC Radio Sussex.

November
No events.

December
18 December – Sounds of Jazz is broadcast on BBC Radio 1 for the final time. The show is transferred to Radio 2 in the new year.

Station debuts
17 January – 
BBC Radio Devon
BBC Radio Cornwall
4 April – County Sound
18 April – BBC Radio Gwent
13 June – Gwent Broadcasting
4 July – BBC Radio York
29 August – Southern Sound Radio
5 September –
Signal 1
Marcher Sound

Closing this year
6 October – Centre Radio (1981–1983)

Programme debuts
 1 February – In Business on BBC Radio 4 (1983–Present)
 12 February – Sounds of the 60s on BBC Radio 2 (1983–Present)

Continuing radio programmes

1940s
 Sunday Half Hour (1940–2018)
 Desert Island Discs (1942–Present)
 Down Your Way (1946–1992)
 Letter from America (1946–2004)
 Woman's Hour (1946–Present)
 A Book at Bedtime (1949–Present)

1950s
 The Archers (1950–Present)
 The Today Programme (1957–Present)
 Sing Something Simple (1959–2001)
 Your Hundred Best Tunes (1959–2007)

1960s
 Farming Today (1960–Present)
 In Touch (1961–Present)
 The World at One (1965–Present)
 The Official Chart (1967–Present)
 Just a Minute (1967–Present)
 The Living World (1968–Present)
 The Organist Entertains (1969–2018)

1970s
 PM (1970–Present)
 Start the Week (1970–Present)
 Week Ending (1970–1998)
 You and Yours (1970–Present)
 I'm Sorry I Haven't a Clue (1972–Present)
 Good Morning Scotland (1973–Present)
 Kaleidoscope (1973–1998)
 Newsbeat (1973–Present)
 The News Huddlines (1975–2001)
 File on 4 (1977–Present)
 Money Box (1977–Present)
 The News Quiz (1977–Present)
 Breakaway (1979–1998)
 Feedback (1979–Present)
 The Food Programme (1979–Present)
 Science in Action (1979–Present)

1980s
 Radio Active (1980–1987)

Births
 19 January – MistaJam, born Peter Dalton, DJ
 6 August – Lloyd Langford, Welsh comedian
 16 August – Colin Griffiths, TV presenter and DJ

Deaths
 22 February – Sir Adrian Boult, orchestral conductor, BBC director of music (born 1889)
 24 December – Alan Melville, scriptwriter and war reporter (born 1910)

See also 
 1983 in British music
 1983 in British television
 1983 in the United Kingdom
 List of British films of 1983

References

Radio
British Radio, 1983 In
Years in British radio